Doroninskaya is a rural locality (a village) in Shelotskoye Rural Settlement, Verkhovazhsky District, Vologda Oblast, Russia. The population was 18 as of 2002.

Geography 
Doroninskaya is located 61 km southwest of Verkhovazhye (the district's administrative centre) by road. Tatarinskaya is the nearest rural locality.

References 

Rural localities in Verkhovazhsky District